The men's artistic individual all-around was an artistic gymnastics event held as part of the Gymnastics at the 1912 Summer Olympics programme. The competition was held on 12 July at the Stockholm Olympic Stadium. It was the fourth appearance of the event. There were 44 competitors from 9 nations. Each nation was limited to 6 gymnasts (a marked reduction from the 20 permitted in 1908). The event was won by Alberto Braglia of Italy, the first man to successfully defend a title in the artistic individual all-around. The bronze medalist from 1908, Louis Ségura, this time took silver. Braglia and Ségura were the first two men to win multiple medals in the event. Italian Adolfo Tunesi earned bronze.

As in 1908, the individual results were not considered for any of the team competitions. As in 1900 and 1908, there were no separate apparatus events.

Background

This was the fourth appearance of the men's individual all-around. The first individual all-around competition had been held in 1900, after the 1896 competitions featured only individual apparatus events. A men's individual all-around has been held every Games since 1900.

Four of the top 10 gymnasts from the 1908 Games returned: gold medalist Alberto Braglia of Italy, bronze medalist Louis Ségura of France, sixth-place finisher Samuel Hodgetts of Great Britain, and seventh-place finisher Marcel Lalu of France. Marco Torrès of France (1909) had won a World Championship since the last Games; reigning (1911) World Champion Ferdinand Steiner of Bohemia did not compete in Stockholm.

Denmark, Luxembourg, and the Russian Empire each made their debut in the event. Bohemia, France, Great Britain, Hungary, and Italy each made their third appearance, tying the absent Germany (missing the event for the first time) for most among nations. Germany, Sweden, and Norway had gymnasts competing in the team events, but opted not to have individual gymnasts; Sweden and Norway cited their view that gymnastics should be a team sport with mass displays.

Competition format

Gymnasts competed on the horizontal bar, parallel bars, rings, and pommel horse. Three judges marked each performer in each of the four apparati; these 12 scores were summed to give a final score. The scoring was from 0 to 12; this led to a possible total of 36 on each apparatus and 144 for the grand total.

Schedule

Two three-hour sessions were held on a single day, from 9:30 to 12:30 and from 14:00 to 17:00.

Results

Results are listed in the order that they appeared in the Official Olympic Report, rather than the Olympic Order that exists today.

References

Sources
  (pp 558–559)
 

Gymnastics at the 1912 Summer Olympics